Paolo il freddo (i.e. "Paolo the cold") is a 1974 Italian comedy film written and directed by Ciccio Ingrassia and starring  Franco Franchi. A parody of Marco Vicario's Paolo il caldo, it is Ingrassia's second and last film as a director.

Plot

Cast 

 Franco Franchi as Paolino Pastorino
 Ileana Rigano as  Lucia
 Grazia Di Marzà as  Paolino's Aunt
Guido Leontini as  The Cuckold
 Annie Carol Edel as The Treacherous Wife
 Dante Cleri as  Don Miguel
 Mimmo Baldi as  The Treacherous Wife's Lover
Luca Sportelli as  Federico 
Elio Crovetto as  The Prior 
Isabella Biagini as  The Rich Lady
Ciccio Ingrassia as   Mandracchì the Magician 
Tino Scotti as  Commendator Galbusera
Linda Sini as  The Countess 
 Ciro Papa as Fernando
Moira Orfei as herself

See also
 List of Italian films of 1974

References

External links

Italian comedy films
1974 comedy films
1974 films
1970s parody films
1970s Italian films